Jerry Robinson (1922–2011) was an American comic book artist

Jerry Robinson may also refer to:

Jerry Robinson (kick returner) (1939–2013), American football player
Jerry Robinson (linebacker) (born 1956), American football player

See also
Gerry Robinson (1948–2021), Irish-born British business executive and television presenter